The Four Just Men may refer to:

 The Four Just Men (novel), a 1905 novel by Edgar Wallace, and its adaptations:
 The Four Just Men (1921 film)
 The Four Just Men (1939 film)
 The Four Just Men (TV series)